The 2002 ISAF World Sailing Games was held in Marseille, France, 29 July – 10 July.

The selected classes were 470 (men and women), Hobie 16 (open and women), women's J/22, J/80, men's Laser, women's Laser Radial, Techno 293 (open and women). Each country were allowed to entry two sailors per event, with addition to the ISAF rankings leaders in Olympic classes, winners of the preceding 1998 games and winners of the 2000 Olympics.

Competition format

Events and equipment
Each country were allowed to entry two sailors per event, with addition to the ISAF rankings leaders in Olympic classes (end of April 2002), winners of the preceding 1998 games and winners of the 2000 Olympics.

Invited sailors

Summary

Medal table

Event medalists

References

ISAF World Sailing Games
ISAF World Sailing Games
Sailing competitions in France
ISAF World Sailing Games